Rajat Choudhary (born 10 October 1999) is an Indian cricketer. He made his first-class debut on 17 December 2019, for Rajasthan in the 2019–20 Ranji Trophy. He is an all-rounder who bats right-handed and bowls right-arm off-break.

References

External links
 

1999 births
Living people
Indian cricketers
Rajasthan cricketers